Camet is a Southern French surname. Notable people with the surname include:

Carmelo Camet (1904–2007), Argentine fencer
Francisco Camet (1876–1931), Argentine fencer
Raffaella Camet (born 1992), Peruvian volleyball player

See also 
Estacion Camet, is a railway station and village north of Mar del Plata, Buenos Aires province, Argentina